Kangeyam is a town and municipality in Kangeyam Taluk of Tiruppur district in the Indian state of Tamil Nadu. It is situated on National Highway 81. Kangeyam is an economic center in Tamil Nadu. The main commercial interests of the municipality are rice hulling, coconut oil extraction, ghee production, and groundnut cultivation. The town is located 28 km from the district headquarters at Tiruppur, 45 km from the city of Erode, 70 km from the industrial town of Coimbatore,18 km from the town of vellakovil, 55 km from the city of Karur, 140 km from the Ancient city of Trichy and 441 km from the state capital Chennai.

History
Kangeyam was the capital of KonguNadu in ancient times.
all the clan gods of different peoples have built around the city of Kangeyam.
An ancient beryl mine near Kangeyam produced Indian beryl for export to the Roman Empire, which is why numerous Roman coins have been found near the town.

Economy
The economy of Kangeyam is mostly based in rice hulling, the manufacture of coconut copra (dried kernel used in coconut oil production), ghee production and groundnut cultivation. The region, despite being semi-arid and rain-fed, produces rice throughout the year. Rice procured from the Thanjavur and Cauvery Delta regions in Tamil Nadu and from other states like Karnataka and Andhra Pradesh are also brought to Kangeyam for processing. There are more than 500 rice mills in the taluk.

Coconut oil production in Kangeyam began in the 1980s, when farmers in Tamil Nadu first began cultivating coconuts commercially. Nowadays, Kangeyam is among the major coconut oil producing regions of India; coconut oil produced here is marketed across Tamil Nadu and other states such as Maharashtra, Andhra Pradesh, Karnataka, Gujarat, West Bengal and Madhya Pradesh. Kangeyam coconut oil is also exported internationally. In the production of oil, coconut kernels are first dried on large fields made for this purpose. They are then processed in oil mills to produce coconut oil. There are about 150 coconut oil manufacturing units in and around Kangeyam and about 500 kopra processing and drying units in Kangeyam Taluk.

Kangeyam is sometimes called the "Rice and Oil Town" due to its large rice and coconut oil sectors.

Ghee and ornamental stone production are also major businesses in Kangeyam. The stone that is produced is known as "Moon Stone" and is exported to other countries.

Kangayam is one of the most important cities in India in terms of carbon production. The carbon produced here is exported for domestic use and also abroad.

Kangeyam is also a famous city for vehicle body building(container and open type).
A few other companies that manufacture welded wires are also located within the town. Many spinning mills and knit cloth manufacturing units are located in Kangeyam as the city is close the textile hub of Tiruppur.

Kangeyam Bull 
The Kangeyam Bull is a breed of cattle that is indigenous to the area around Kangeyam. The Kangeyam bull is known for its superior draught strength and adaptability to poor nutritional conditions. They have a compact body with short, stout legs, strong hooves, a short neck and a firm hump, and are usually grey or white in colour.

Demographics

According to the 2011 Census of India, Kangeyam had a population of 32,147 with a ratio of 987 females for every 1,000 males, higher than the national average of 929. 2,811 residents were under the age of six, with 1,485 under-six males and 1,326 females. Scheduled Castes and Scheduled Tribes accounted for 9.33% and 0.07% of the population, respectively. The average literacy of the town was 77.7%, higher than the national average of 72.99%. The town had a total of 9,449 households. There were a total of 15,720 workers. Of the working population, 392 were cultivators, 603 were main agricultural laborers, 1,610 worked in household industries, 11,503 worked in other industries, 1,612 were marginal workers, 63 were marginal cultivators, 155 were marginal agricultural laborers, 225 were marginal workers in household industries, and 1,169 were other marginal workers.

Around 3% of the people were below the poverty line, much lower than the national average of 29.8% and the state average of 17.1%. The population is 88.86% Hindu, 6.22% Muslim, 3.91% Christian, 0.02% Sikh, 0.02% Buddhist, 0.01% Jain and 0.01% Other. 0.95% of the respondents followed no religion or did not state their religion.

Administration and politics
Kangeyam comes under the Tiruppur district. Kangeyam assembly constituency is part of Erode (Lok Sabha constituency). A. Ganesha Murthi is the current Member of Parliament representing Kangeyam. M. P. Saminathan (DMK) represents Kangeyam Constituency in the Tamil Nadu Legislative Assembly.

Transport
Because of its strategic location, Kangeyam is well connected by roads to many major towns in the district. Kangeyam is located on National Highway 81. A state highway running through Kangeyam connects Erode, Kangeyam, Dharapuram, and Palani, in that order. There are two bus stands in Kangeyam - one for "mofussil" buses connecting Kangeyam with surrounding villages and the other for State service buses which connects Kangeyam with other parts of Tamil Nadu. Other state highways that run through Kangeyam are:
SH 81 (Gobichettipalayam - Kangeyam)
SH 96 (Perundurai - Kangeyam)
SH 172 (Tiruppur - Kangeyam),
SH 83A (Erode - Kangeyam - Dharapuram)
SH 189 (Kangeyam - Kodumudi).
Kangeyam is around 28 km from Tirupur, 46 km from Erode, 68 km from Coimbatore,18 km from Vellakovil, 23 km from Uthukuli and 32 km from Dharapuram.

Landmarks 

Sivanmalai is a Hindu temple located on the State Highway 172 and is located about 4 km from Kangeyam. The temple is located atop a small hill.

Utilities
There is a 54-bed government hospital in Kangeyam. Four Primary Health Centres are under the administration of the Kangeyam Health Block, which is itself administrated by the Tiruppur Health Unit District (HUD). Besides these, there are a number of private hospitals in the town. A number of schools and colleges are situated in and around Kangeyam.

Weather
Kangeyam South is one of the driest parts of Tamil Nadu.
Kangeyam average rainfall around 600mm.It is highly dependent on the rainfall during the months of October and November. About 250-300 mm of rainfall is available during this time. During the southwest monsoon, there is a high level of wind(wind gust around 70kmhr), which results in less rainfall. January to March is mostly without rain. April and May are the hottest months of the year with thundershowers during the day.

References

External links 
 Official website of Kangeyam municipality

Cities and towns in Tiruppur district